Carla Devlin (née Ashford;born 13 March 1979 in Northallerton) is a British rower. She finished 5th in the women's eight at the 2008 Summer Olympics. In 2020 she was a contestant on the Channel 4 television show SAS: Who Dares Wins.

References

External links 
 
 

1979 births
Living people
English female rowers
British female rowers
People from Northallerton
Rowers at the 2008 Summer Olympics
Olympic rowers of Great Britain
Sportspeople from Yorkshire

World Rowing Championships medalists for Great Britain